Sunoco LP  is an American master limited partnership organized under Delaware state laws and headquartered in Dallas, Texas. Dating back to 1886, the company has transitioned from a vertically integrated energy company to a distributor of motor fuels. It was previously engaged in oil and natural gas exploration and production, refining, chemical manufacturing, and retail fuel sales, but divested these businesses. Sunoco is the largest independent distributor of motor fuels in the United States.

Its current operational focus dates back to 2018 when it divested the non-core convenience store operations to 7-Eleven, Inc. to focus on fuel distribution and midstream terminal operations.

Sunoco distributes multiple fuel brands and also owns its own brand of retail fuel, which shares the same name as the parent company. Sunoco distributes fuel to approximately 10,000 locations across more than 40 US States and territories. It also operates 27 fuel terminals across the mainland United States, Hawaii, and Puerto Rico. 

The partnership was known as Sun Company Inc. from 1886 to 1920 and 1976 to 1998, and as Sun Oil Co. from 1920 to 1976. (The Sunoco name is a condensation of SUN Oil COmpany.)

History

1800s to 1950s: founding and growth

The partnership began as The Peoples Natural Gas Company in Pittsburgh, Pennsylvania. In 1886, its partners – Joseph Newton Pew, Philip Pisano, and Edward O. Emerson – decided to expand their gas business with a stake in the new oil discoveries in Ohio and Pennsylvania. Four years later, the growing enterprise became the Sun Oil Company of Ohio. Sun Oil diversified quickly, active in production and distribution of oil as well as processing and marketing refined products. By 1901, the company was incorporated in New Jersey as Sun Company.

In 1902, the Sun Oil Refining Company was chartered in Texas, as it turned its interest to the new Spindletop field in Texas.  Joseph Pew's nephew, J. Edgar Pew, was able to buy the storage and transportation assets of Lone Star and Crescent Oil Company at a receivership auction.  Spindletop oil was then shipped to the company's Marcus Hook, Pennsylvania, refinery.

Pew's sons, J. Howard Pew and Joseph N. Pew Jr. would take over the company after their father's death.

With a growing portfolio of oil fields and refineries, Sun opened its first service station in Ardmore, Pennsylvania, in 1920. In 1922, it changed its name back to Sun Oil Company and, in 1925, it became a public company via an initial public offering on the New York Stock Exchange. Sunoco ranked 39th among United States corporations in the value of World War II production contracts. Sun expanded internationally following the war. Its first Canadian refinery was built in 1953 in Sarnia, Ontario, home to a burgeoning new petrochemical industry. Sun established a facility at Venezuela's Lake Maracaibo in 1957, which produced over a billion barrels (160,000,000 m3) before the operation was nationalized in 1975.

Custom blending
In 1956, Sunoco introduced "custom blending" pumps, an innovation that allowed customers of Sunoco service stations to choose from several octane ratings through a single pump. Sunoco stations offered as many as eight grades of "Custom Blended" gasolines from its "Dial A Grade" pumps ranging from subregular Sunoco 190 to Sunoco 260, the latter a super-premium grade of 102 octane that was advertised as the "highest octane pump gas" and very popular with operators of V8-powered muscle cars of the 1960s.

1960s to 2000s: acquisitions and branding
In 1967, Sun established its Great Canadian Oil Sands Limited facility in northern Alberta, Canada, to access the estimated 300 billion barrels (48 km3) of extractable oil in the Athabasca oil sands.

In 1968, Sun Oil merged with Tulsa, Oklahoma-based Sunray DX Oil Company, which refined and marketed gasoline under the DX brand in several midwestern states, and included several refineries. Its Tulsa refinery was operated by Sun until its sale in June 2009 to Holly Corporation of Dallas. This move expanded Sun's marketing area into the mid-continent region.

Sun Oil continued marketing its petroleum products under both the Sunoco and DX brands through the 1970s and into the 1980s. In the late 1980s, Sun began rebranding DX stations in the Midwest to the Sunoco brand, but by the early 1990s, they pulled out of virtually all areas in the southeastern U.S. and west of the Mississippi, resulting in the closing and rebranding of service stations and jobbers to other brands in those areas, notably Sinclair in Oklahoma and Kerr-McGee in Arkansas.

With increased diversification, Sun Oil Company was renamed Sun Company in 1976. In 1980, Sun acquired the U.S. oil and gas properties of Texas Pacific Oil Company, Inc., a subsidiary of The Seagram Company, Ltd., for US$2.3 billion – the second largest acquisition in U.S. history to that date.

Through the 1980s, Sun developed oil interests in the North Sea and offshore China and expanded its holdings in both oil and coal with additional U.S. business acquisitions. In 1983, Sun Oil launched Sunoco ULTRA 94, the market's highest octane unleaded gasoline. Then in 1988, Sun undertook a restructuring to segregate its domestic oil and gas exploration and production business and the focus the company on its refining and marketing business. This led to the acquisition of Atlantic Refining and Marketing (and, in effect, that company's convenience store chain, A-Plus), including its Philadelphia refinery which was later merged with the former Gulf Oil refinery next door that Sunoco acquired from Chevron.

By the 1990s, Sun had departed the international exploration business and was fully dedicated to its branded products and services. In 1994, Sunoco acquired the Philadelphia Chevron Oil refinery consolidating operations with its own adjacent which it had acquired with Atlantic. Sun sold its remaining interest in Canada's Suncor Energy in 1995, but markets product from two refineries – one in Toledo, Ohio, and the other Sarnia, Ontario – in joint ventures. In 1998, Sun Company, Inc. became Sunoco, Inc. In 2011 the Toledo facility was sold to PBF Energy.

In 1998, Sun acquired the chemical business of Allied Signal, including a phenol plant. The business was renamed as "Sunoco Chemicals, Inc." In 2011, the plant was acquired by Honeywell for $85 million.

In 2003, Speedway LLC, then a subsidiary of Marathon Petroleum, sold 193 convenience stores to Sunoco. It also acquired many service stations from Coastal Petroleum.

In 2004, Sunoco replaced the ConocoPhillips' 76 brand as the "Official Fuel of NASCAR."

After ConocoPhillips abandoned the marketing of the Mobil brand name in the Washington, D.C., area, Sunoco purchased these rights, converted Maryland and Virginia Mobil stations to the Sunoco brand, bringing the A-Plus convenience store with them – prior to this, these stations had convenience stores under the Circle K or On the Run brands.

In September 2009, Sunoco sold its retail heating oil and propane distribution business to Superior Plus for $82.5 million in cash.

In 2012, Sunoco demolished its Eagle Point refinery complex in West Deptford Township, New Jersey, which had been idle since 2010.

In Canada, the Sunoco brand was licensed for the Ontario retail gas station operations of Suncor Energy until 2010. Following Suncor's acquisition of Petro-Canada, all Canadian Sunoco outlets were converted to Petro-Canada branding, except for one location in Port Colborne, Ontario.

Exit from refinery business
In December 2010, Sunoco sold its refinery in Toledo, Ohio, to PBF Energy for $400 million. Effective September 6, 2011, Sunoco announced that it would exit the crude oil refining business and seek to sell its Philadelphia and Marcus Hook refineries by mid-2012. The company has said that its cost for exiting the refining business could be as high as $2.7 billion. According to one report, the company had lost some $800 million on refining operations since 2009; an earlier report provided a figure of $772 million.

On December 1, 2011, Sunoco announced it would accelerate closure of the Marcus Hook facility. The Marcus Hook facility, founded in 1902 and covering 781 acres, was dedicated exclusively to the processing of light sweet crude oil; this processing focus combined with volatility in crude oil prices are considered contributing factors to both this refinery's closure and Sunoco's exit from the refinery business.

Joint venture, bankruptcy, and future closure
In September 2012, Sunoco formed a joint venture with The Carlyle Group, allowing for the continuation of operations at the Philadelphia refinery, and temporarily saving over 800 jobs. However, on January 22, 2018, the joint venture, named Philadelphia Energy Solutions, filed for bankruptcy. The bankruptcy announcement was followed by a damaging fire on June 21, 2019, which occurred at the 30,000 bpd alkylation unit. The explosion of the alkylation unit triggered a massive fireball and caused nearby homes to shake. A few days later, on June 26 the refinery complex announced it would cease operations and shut down.

Sale to Energy Transfer Partners and merger with Susser Holdings

In 2012, Dallas-based energy company Energy Transfer Partners purchased Sunoco. Sunoco would subsequently move its corporate headquarters to Dallas in 2016.

In 2014, Energy Transfer Partners acquired Susser Holdings Corporation, the parent company of Stripes Convenience Stores, and merged it with Sunoco into a master limited partnership, forming Sunoco LP. In Texas, the Sunoco brand replaced Valero Energy at the Stripes locations; Stripes and A-Plus remained separate brands.

Also in 2014, Sunoco LP acquired Aloha Petroleum.

In 2015, Aloha Petroleum acquired stores including a Subway in Hawaii.

Additionally, Sunoco LP purchased eight Pico convenience stores in South Central Texas.

In December 2015, Sunoco LP completed its acquisition of Alta East, Inc., a wholesale motor fuel distribution business serving the northeast United States.

In June 2016, Sunoco LP purchased Valentine Convenience stores, consisting of 18 locations selling more than 20 million gallons of fuel, as well as Texas based Kolkhorst Petroleum, Inc. Kolkhorst operated 14 convenience stores under the Rattler's brand and distributed more than 46 million gallons of fuel.

Denny Oil, a convenience store and wholesale distributor operator was purchased by Sunoco LP in October 2016, adding an additional 90 million gallons of fuel to its distribution business.

In November 2016, Sunoco Logistics LP acquired Energy Transfer Partners LP for $21 billion.

Introduction of Sunoco UltraTech and Top Tier fuel
In April 2017, Sunoco introduced at all of its stations Sunoco UltraTech, a high detergent fuel blend that met Top Tier standards. Sunoco UltraTech contains the same detergent level as the fuel Sunoco makes for NASCAR.

Sale of stores to Seven & I Holdings Co.
In January 2018, the company sold 1,030 retail stores to 7-Eleven and agreed to supply 2.2 billion gallons of fuel to 7-Eleven convenience stores annually for 15 years. This included Sunoco's contract to the service plazas along the Pennsylvania Turnpike.

Focus on fuel distribution and midstream operations
Sunoco diversified its portfolio in August 2016 with the acquisition of Emerge Energy Services LP, entering into the business of processing transmix fuels.

On April 2, Sunoco announced the completion of the conversion of its 2017 retail sites located in certain West Texas, Oklahoma, and New Mexico markets to a single commission agent, Cal's Convenience Inc. That month also saw the acquisition of Superior Plus Energy Services, adding three terminals and approximately 200 million gallons to Sunoco LP's wholesale fuels business. Additional 2018 acquisitions included Sandford Energy, LLC. in August, BRENCO Marketing Corp. in October, and Schmitt Sales Inc. in December.

Sunoco LP announced the completion of the acquisition of the refined terminalling business from American Midstream Partners, LP on December 20, 2018.

In 2019, Sunoco LP announced a 50 percent ownership joint venture with Energy Transfer on the J.C. Nolan diesel fuel pipeline that connects west Texas to the Gulf Coast.

On January 18, 2019, Sunoco LP announced the execution of a definitive asset purchase agreement with Attis Industries Inc. for the sale of Sunoco LP's ethanol plant, including the grain malting operation in Fulton, New York.

As of 2020, Sunoco still operates 78 retail locations, all of which are located in New Jersey and Hawaii (branded as Aloha Petroleum).

Exclusive deals
Sunoco had exclusive deals as the gasoline supplier at the travel plazas along the Ohio Turnpike, Pennsylvania Turnpike, New Jersey Turnpike, Garden State Parkway, Atlantic City Expressway, Palisades Parkway, and Delaware Turnpike.

Sunoco also operates some of the filling stations on the New York Thruway, as well as the two service areas – Chesapeake House and Maryland House – along Interstate 95 in Maryland.

Environmental record
In 2014, Sunoco was one of 50 companies sued by Pennsylvania, which alleged that the companies polluted waters with MTBE, a gasoline additive.

In 2000, Sunoco leaked 190,000 gallons of oil into the John Heinz National Wildlife Refuge at Tinicum in Pennsylvania through a cracked pipe. Sunoco claimed their systems did not detect the leak; the leak was reported by a hiker in the Wildlife Refuge.

In 1993, when the company owned refineries, it signed the Coalition for Environmentally Responsible Economies (Ceres) principal.

On April 4, 1991, Pennsylvania Senator H. John Heinz III was killed when his airplane collided with a Sun Company helicopter in what is known as the Merion air disaster. Falling debris killed two children at the Merion Elementary School in the Lower Merion School District. The National Transportation Safety Board determined that the probable cause of the accident included poor judgment and errors on the behalf of both pilots.

Sunoco Race Fuels
Sunoco Race Fuels is a refiner and distributor of racing fuels. Originally featuring two high-octane options (Sunoco 260 and 280), Sunoco Race Fuels now produces 18 different high-performance fuel blends, which are used for all types of professional motorsports. All Sunoco Race Fuels products are refined at Sunoco LP's Marcus Hook facility.

Sunoco Race Fuels also holds partnerships as the Official Fuel or spec fuel of popular racing series including NASCAR, SCCA, IHRA, PASS, SVRA, and Trans Am.

Motorsports partnerships
The Sunoco fuel brand was Team Penske's sponsor of choice for many years, particularly in the SCCA Trans-Am Series, where Roger Penske's Sunoco Camaros won the championship in 1968 and 1969. Sunoco also sponsored Penske Porsches in the SCCA Can-Am series, and won the Indianapolis 500 in 1972 with Penske and driver Mark Donohue.

Between 1989 and 1992, Sunoco sponsored NASCAR team owner Billy Hagan's No. 94 Cup team. Sterling Marlin drove the #94 Sunoco Ultra94 Oldsmobile during the 1989–90 seasons and Terry Labonte for the 1991–92 seasons.

From 1995 to 1997, Sunoco was the primary sponsor of ST Motorsports' #47 Chevrolet, driven by Jeff Fuller. Fuller captured his lone NASCAR Busch Grand National Series (now NASCAR Xfinity Series) victory at Bristol Motor Speedway on August 23, 1996.

Sunoco was the official fuel supplier of the IndyCar Series (now the Verizon IndyCar Series) from 2011 through 2018. In 2013, Sunoco sponsored the #60 Panther Racing Chevrolet in the 97th Running of the Indianapolis 500 with driver Townsend Bell. Following their participation in that event, Sunoco partnered with KV Racing and driver Tony Kanaan, who won the 2013 Indianapolis 500, for a four-race primary sponsorship agreement.

In 2015, Sunoco became the Official Fuel of the National Hot Rod Association.

In 2016, Sunoco was the founding partner of the "Daytona Rising" project, which was highlighted by the reimagining of the historic Daytona International Speedway. The Sunoco Injector, a branded fan engagement area built as part of the new stadium opened during NASCAR's Daytona 500 weekend that year.

In 2017/2018, Sunoco became the official race fuel for the Canadian Snow Cross Circuit, CSRA.

In 2019, Sunoco signed on to be the presenting sponsor of the Richmond Raceway eSports Fueled By Sunoco, an eNASCAR iRacing World Championship Series team, with Malik Ray driving the #90 Sunoco Toyota Camry. Beginning in 2020, defending series champion Zack Novak will pilot the Sunoco-sponsored entry, with Jimmy Mullis as his RR eSports teammate in the #46 Toyota.

Sponsorships
Due to its large presence in Western Pennsylvania, Sunoco is a longtime sponsor of the Pittsburgh Pirates. Sunoco also held partnerships with additional Major League Baseball teams, including the New York Yankees, Philadelphia Phillies, Detroit Tigers, and the Boston Red Sox.

With its former headquarters in the Philadelphia area, Sunoco was a sponsor of the Philadelphia Union, a Major League Soccer franchise.

Sunoco is also a partner with the Hersheypark amusement facility in Hershey, Pennsylvania. They are the presenting sponsor of the Twin Turnpike ride at the park. They are also a sponsor of the Hershey Bears, an affiliate of the Washington Capitals in the American Hockey League.

References

External links
 Official webpage
 

 
Oil companies of the United States
Oil pipeline companies
Automotive fuel retailers
Gas stations in the United States
Companies based in Philadelphia
Retail companies established in 1886
Non-renewable resource companies established in 1886
1886 establishments in Pennsylvania
Energy companies established in 1976
Non-renewable resource companies established in 1976
1976 establishments in Pennsylvania
Companies formerly listed on the New York Stock Exchange
Economy of the Eastern United States
Energy in Pennsylvania
2012 mergers and acquisitions